Ann Goldstein (born June 1949) is an American editor and translator from the Italian language. She is best known for her translations of Elena Ferrante's Neapolitan Quartet. She was the panel chair for translated fiction at the US National Book Award in 2022. She was awarded the PEN Renato Poggioli prize in 1994 and was a Guggenheim Fellow in 2008.

Early life
Ann Goldstein grew up in Maplewood, New Jersey. She attended Bennington College, in Vermont, where she read Ancient Greek. She then studied comparative philology at University College, London.

Career
After her graduation, in 1973, Goldstein began work at Esquire magazine as a proof-reader. In 1974, she joined the staff of The New Yorker, working in the copy department and becoming its head in the late 1980s. She retired from The New Yorker in 2017.

From 1987, Goldstein edited John Updike's literary reviews contributed to The New Yorker.

During her time at The New Yorker, Goldstein, along with some colleagues, began taking Italian lessons. Over a period of three years, from 1987, they studied the language and read all of Dante's works. In 1992, Goldstein received Chekhov in Sondrio, a book by Aldo Buzzi, an Italian writer, and she attempted to translate an essay from it. This became Goldstein's first translation publication, coming out in the Sept. 14, 1992, edition of the New Yorker.

In 2004, Goldstein was asked by Europa Editions, a new imprint, to submit a translation of passages from Elena Ferrante's The Days of Abandonment. Her sample was judged the best among the submissions, and she was offered the contract to translate the book.

In 2015, a three-volume publication of the complete works of Primo Levi came out, edited by Goldstein. The effort of obtaining translation rights took six years, while its compilation and translation took seventeen years, and it was acclaimed by critics. Goldstein oversaw the team of nine translators and translated three of Levi's books.

Accolades
Jennifer Maloney in The Wall Street Journal writes in 2016:
"Translators rarely achieve celebrity status. But as Ms. Ferrante’s star has risen, so too has Ms. Goldstein’s. Her English translations of the four books in Ms. Ferrante’s Neapolitan series have sold more than a million copies in North America, the U.K., Australia and New Zealand. Ms. Goldstein ... is now one of the most sought-after translators of Italian literature."

Robert Weil, editor-in-chief and publishing director of Liveright, has said of Goldstein, “Her name on a book now is gold."

Selected works

Translated
 Fiction
 
 
 
 
 
 
 
 
 
 
 
 
 
 
 
 
 
 
 
 
 Non-fiction

Edited

Honours
 1993, 2002 – Fellowship of the American Academy in Rome
 2008 – Guggenheim Fellowship
 PEN Renato Poggioli Translation Award

References 

Bennington College alumni
Alumni of University College London
Living people
20th-century American translators
Italian–English translators
Literary translators
1949 births
20th-century American women writers
21st-century American women
The New Yorker editors